The Red Line is a proposed east–west mass transit light rail line for Baltimore, Maryland.  The project had been granted federal approval to enter the preliminary engineering phase and the Maryland Transit Administration had spent roughly $300 million in planning, design and land acquisition. The project was projected to cost roughly $1.6 billion, $900 million of which was guaranteed funding by the federal government. Maryland Governor Larry Hogan declared on June 25, 2015 that he would not provide state funds for the project. Governor Hogan shifted $736 million of state funding to roads in suburban areas.

While campaigning for Governor, Hogan characterized the project as a "boondoggle".  Hogan has been accused of corruption since his shift of state priorities to road funding has resulted in the construction of several major projects near properties owned by his company. The Red Line cancellation was briefly investigated by the United States Department of Transportation for being in possible violation of Title VI of the Civil Rights Act of 1964, since his decision shifted a large quantity of state money from predominantly Black and low-income neighborhoods into affluent and predominantly white areas, but, after a change in presidential administrations, the investigation was closed with no finding.

The line's construction had been estimated to begin in late 2015–early 2016, subject to funding, with a completion date set for late 2021–early 2022.

The project currently remains inactive; however, several groups continue to campaign for its construction. The recently passed Infrastructure Investment and Jobs Act contains a provision on project reentry which directs the United States Secretary of Transportation to "provide full and fair consideration to projects that seek an updated rating after a period of inactivity." This provision was sought by Ben Cardin with the intent to allow for the Red Line and other canceled transit projects to be renewed. In December 2022, Governor-elect Wes Moore announced that he intended to revive the Red Line project.

Background
In 2001, then-Maryland Secretary of Transportation John Porcari appointed a 23-member independent commission, the Baltimore Region Rail System Plan Advisory Committee, to make suggestions for new rail lines and expansions of existing lines.  The proposals used a unified branding scheme for the existing lines and the proposed new lines, identifying each line by a color, as the Washington Metro and many other transit agencies do.

In the commission's report, the Red Line was an east–west line that would begin at the Social Security Administration offices in Woodlawn in Baltimore County, travel through West Baltimore with an intermodal stop at the West Baltimore MARC station, pass through downtown where it would intersect the existing Metro Subway and Light Rail lines, and pass through East Baltimore with stops in the gentrified neighborhoods of Fells Point, Canton, and the area around Patterson Park. The Red Line was designated by the commission as the starting component for new work on the 6-line system.

Out of the commission's various proposals, the Red Line was taken up with the most enthusiasm by area officials.  Progress was slowed by a debate between state Secretary of Transportation Robert Flanagan on one side, and the Baltimore City government and Congressional delegation on the other over the mode: Flanagan favored a bus rapid transit (BRT) solution with separate right-of-way components like Boston's Silver Line, while the other officials favored a light rail  rapid transit line or heavy rail and insisted that both modes of rail transit be included in studies.

Heavy rail was dismissed by Flanagan as an alternative, due to an estimated cost of $2.2 billion to $2.6 billion. With ridership of only 45,000 on Baltimore's existing Metro system at the time of his appointment, he did not expect the Red Line to reach the 140,000 to 150,000 ridership level necessary to attract federal funding for a new heavy rail line.

Red Line alternatives

 TSM: Transportation systems management (using the existing bus system, with modifications to signalling, lane assignments, and controls)
 BRT: Bus rapid transit
 LRT: Light rail transit

Modified alternative 4C selected by governor 

In August 2009, then-Governor Martin O'Malley selected a modified version of the Light Rail Alternative 4C, which became known as the "Locally Preferred Alternative (LPA)." The modification eliminated two stations and a small parking lot from the original Alternative 4C plans, but included an expansion of parking at the West Baltimore MARC station.

Two features of the original Alternative 4C plan, considered important by the Citizens Advisory Council, remained part of the Locally Preferred Alternative:

 Much of the proposed route through West Baltimore ran generally along U.S. Route 40, including the depressed freeway section left over from the cancellation of Interstates 70 and 170 within the city limits.  This freeway section was built to accommodate a transit line in the median, and the Red Line would most likely have used this route to achieve grade separation though the area. The western end of former I-170 was demolished in 2010 to allow for additional parking and median access for the Red Line. A similar modification was also planned for the eastern end of former I-70, where the MD 122/Security Boulevard interchange would be converted to an at-grade intersection, and a new Park & Ride lot would have been built to replace the one that sits east of said interchange. At the rebuilt intersection, the Red Line would have gone through the western portal of the Cooks Lane tunnel, MD 122 would have tied directly into Forest Park Avenue, and Cooks Boulevard would have been a westward extension of Cooks Lane, built as a surface road on the old I-70 alignment. Although the modifications have not yet occurred, I-70 from MD 122 to I-695 was decommissioned in 2014 and now ends at its stack interchange with I-695.
 The LPA provided for the line to go underground along Martin Luther King, Jr. Boulevard and to surface on Boston Street near the Can Company in Canton, bypassing downtown Baltimore's narrow streets and crowded traffic conditions. Another tunnel bypasses Cooks Lane, but the original LPA version reduced the tunnel to a single track alignment. Adjustments to the LPA were later made to allow a second track in the Cooks Lane tunnel.

With the Federal Transit Administration's approval in June 2011 to start preliminary engineering, the project made its first step beyond the concept stage; however, the FTA estimated daily ridership for the completed system at 57,000 and expected it to cost a total of $2.2 billion with inflation included. Henry Kay, MTA's deputy administrator, estimated the cost of preliminary engineering at $65 million. The state would have had to pay preliminary engineering costs, but Kay said that these and other upfront costs would be eligible for federal reimbursement.

Cancelation and Federal Investigation

Governor Larry Hogan, who was elected in 2014, announced on June 25, 2015 that he had canceled funding for the Red Line. During his 2014 campaign, Hogan had complained about the cost of the proposed Red Line for Baltimore and a proposed Purple Line for the Maryland suburbs of Washington, DC; however, he said that the Purple Line would continue at a reduced level of funding.

Federal Investigation

On December 21, 2015, the National Association for the Advancement of Colored People (NAACP), together with the American Civil Liberties Union of Maryland and Baltimore Regional Initiative Developing Genuine Equality (BRIDGE) filed a complaint pursuant to Title VI of the Civil Rights Act of 1964 with the U.S. Department of Transportation Departmental Office of Civil Rights. The complaint challenged Governor Hogan's decision to cancel the Red Line on the basis of discrimination against Baltimore's predominantly African American population that would have benefited from the infrastructure project. Furthermore, the complaint highlighted that Governor Hogan's decision shifted funding away from public transportation dependent citizens, and instead was dedicated towards highway projects in rural areas of the state that are primarily Caucasian.

On January 19, 2017, the last day of the Obama Administration, the Department of Transportation announced it expanded its investigation into Governor Hogan's decision to cancel the Red Line, as well as the rest of MDOT's programs to determine whether federal law was violated. In addition, the DOT stated that the state transportation agency did not take the federal law into account or the adverse impact it would have on African-Americans, nor did the Governor seek any input from MDOT in making the decision. In July 2017, under the administration of Donald Trump, the DOT announced that it was closing its investigation with no finding.

Proposed route and stations
The alignment for the Red Line would have followed an east–west path. Starting from the west, the proposed stations were as follows:

NOTES
A authorized employee parking only
F facility parking only
P paid parking
R residential parking only

Red Line system features

Citizens' Advisory Council

Establishment of Council
The "Citizens' Advisory Council for the Baltimore Corridor Transit Study - Red Line" was established by the Maryland General Assembly in 2006.

Governor Robert Erlich vetoed the bills which originally created the Citizens' Advisory Council on May 26, 2006, and replaced it with the "Red Line Community Advisory Council." This 15-member Council was appointed entirely by the Governor.

At a special session in June 2006, the Legislature overrode the Governor's veto. The Council established by the Legislature also had 15 members, but only two could be appointed by the Governor. Five of the other Council members were appointed by the Senate President, five by the Speaker of the House, two by the Baltimore City Mayor and one by the Baltimore County Executive. Two co-chairs for the Council could be chosen by the Governor or the Maryland Transit Administrator from up to four nominees selected by the Senate President and Speaker of the House.

On July 30, 2007, an executive order by Governor Martin O'Malley restored the name originally selected by the Legislature.

First annual report to General Assembly
On September 9, 2008, the Red Line Citizens' Advisory Council voted unanimously to adopt its first report to the General Assembly, which included the statement that "Preparation of a SDEIS [Supplemental Draft Environmental Impact Statement] should begin now, as a collaborative effort between the MTA and the public in finding the best ways to invest over a billion dollars in Baltimore's transportation infrastructure in keeping with the vision of the 2002 Plan."

Council dispute over Alternative 4C
A recommendation for Alternative 4C (light rail with a downtown tunnel and a Cooks Lane tunnel) was approved by a vote of five to two at the Citizens' Advisory Council meeting on December 11, 2008. Two of the nine members present abstained.

Red Line Community Compact
This document, signed by city and state officials, and 72 leaders of community organizations on September 12, 2008, described how they intended to build and operate the Red Line for the benefit of Baltimore and its communities. The Community Compact emphasized four main points:

 Put Baltimore to work on the Red Line: encourage and promote local and minority contract participation.
 Make the Red Line green: include green space and environmental improvements into the project.
 Community-centered station design, development and stewardship
 Reduce impact of construction on communities

Mayor Sheila Dixon appointed leaders from city government, non-profit and citizen groups, and the business community to a 40-member steering committee to implement each part of the Community Compact. The Red Line Community Compact Steering Committee held their first meeting on February 19, 2009; the group was scheduled to meet quarterly throughout the life of the project.

The decision at the meeting on December 11, 2008 was disputed at another Advisory Council meeting on July 9, 2009, where 11 members were present. A six to five vote favored rescinding the previous decision for Alternative 4C. Council Chair Angela Bethea-Spearman ruled that the motion to rescind failed, because the vote was less than a 2/3 majority. She cited "Robert's Rules" as the criteria for requiring a 2/3 majority and denying the rescision.

Community opposition to Alternative 4C
Beginning in late 2008, Baltimore City favored the "4C Alternative" selected by Governor O'Malley in 2009, which was endorsed by Mayor Sheila Dixon; however, the 2008 Citizens Advisory Council annual report commented on the opposition of community groups to surface rail alignments through residential neighborhoods.

A letter from the Allendale Community Association, read at a meeting of the Citizens Advisory Council on December 11, 2008, expressed the Association's opposition to Alternative 4C and any surface rail construction along Edmondson Avenue.

The West–East Coalition (WEC) Against Red Line Alternative 4C, established in June 2009, represented community associations, homeowners groups, businesses, and religious groups opposed to the Alternative 4C. Its now-defunct website explained that the organization considered the proposed light rail alignment to be a detriment to communities on both the East and West sides of Baltimore.

In a letter to Governor Martin O'Malley, Senator Barbara Mikulski, Senator Benjamin Cardin, Congressman Elijah Cummings, Congressman John P. Sarbanes, and Mayor Sheila Dixon on July 13, 2009, the WEC described concerns about the effects of double-tracked surface rail, traffic congestion, and safety concerns.
 
In 2009, the WEC circulated a petition against the surface Red Line in the Canton neighborhood. It delivered 1,350 signed cards to Governor O'Malley on July 31, 2009.

Support for Red Line and Political Action Committee
In the summer of 2011 the Red Line Now Political Action Committee (PAC) was established to voice the support of residents of Baltimore City for the funding and construction of Alternative 4C. Its website stated that the organization was staffed on a volunteer basis and planned to support local politicians that supported the construction of the Red Line. Red Line Now PAC was governed by a nine-member board of directors who were citizen volunteers who lived and/or worked along what would have been the Red Line corridor. The board members represented the Midtown, Edmondson, Canton, Fells Point, Patterson Park, and Greektown communities.

See also
 Green Line - a proposed rail line in Baltimore from Johns Hopkins Hospital to Morgan State University.
 Yellow Line - a proposed rail line from Hunt Valley to Columbia Town Center.
Charles Street Trolley - a proposed trolley line in northern Baltimore, backed by a non-MTA group.

References

External links
 Red Line Political Action Committee

Maryland Transit Administration
Proposed railway lines in Maryland
Light rail in Maryland